Sittin' in With (sometimes Sittin' in) was an American jazz and blues record label run by Bob Shad. It was active from 1948 to 1952.

Shad and his brother Morty founded the label in 1948 in New York City, and released swing jazz, mainstream jazz, blues, and R&B music. Shad later went on to work with Jax Records, EmArcy Records, and Mainstream Records.

Artists

Ray Abrams
Chu Berry
Beryl Booker
Ray Charles
Earl Coleman
Leroy Dallas
Julian Dash
Champion Jack Dupree
Stan Getz
Wardell Gray
Big John Greer
Al Haig
John Hardee
Peppermint Harris
Smokey Hogg
Lightnin' Hopkins
Dave Lambert
Brownie McGhee
Elmore Nixon
Buddy Stewart
Arbee Stidham
Sonny Terry
Charlie Ventura
Curley Weaver
James Wayne

Bibliography
Howard Rye, "Sittin' in With". The New Grove Dictionary of Jazz. 2nd edition, ed. Barry Kernfeld, Oxford, 2004.
“The Shad Labels,” Blues Research, no.16 (n.d. [?1966]), 2
A. Shaw: Honkers and Shouters: the Golden Years of Rhythm and Blues (New York, 1978), 140
N. Darwen and T. Shad: “Bob Shad the Record Man: the Sittin’ in With Story,” Blues & Rhythm, no.100 (1995), 16 [incl. discography]

American record labels
Record labels established in 1948
Record labels disestablished in 1952